Punta Chame is a corregimiento in Chame District, Panamá Oeste Province, Panama with a population of 443 as of 2010. Its population as of 1990 was 294; its population as of 2000 was 375.

References

Corregimientos of Panamá Oeste Province